André Cauvin (12 February 1907 – 2 April 2004) was a Belgian documentary film director. He directed five films between 1939 and 1955. His 1952 film Bongolo was entered into the 1953 Cannes Film Festival.

Filmography
 Nos soldats d'Afrique (1939)
 Congo (1945)
 L' Équateur aux cent visages (1948)
 Bongolo (1952)
 Bwana Kitoko (1955)

References

External links

1907 births
2004 deaths
Belgian film directors
Belgian screenwriters
Belgian film producers
People from Ixelles
20th-century screenwriters